Sally T. Reynolds (born 1932) is an Australian botanist.

Reynolds worked at the Queensland Herbarium as principal botanist. She was a specialist on Australian Sapindaceae. Paul Forster named Synima reynoldsiae in recognition of her work on the species.

Names published 
She has published 169 names, including:
Alectryon diversifolius (F.Muell.) S.T.Reynolds, Austrobaileya 2(4): 335 (1987): (1987).
Atalaya calcicola S.T.Reynolds, Austrobaileya 1(4): 404 (1981) (1981).
Cupaniopsis newmanii S.T.Reynolds, Austrobaileya 2(1): 49 (1984) (1984).
Elattostachys microcarpa S.T.Reynolds, Fl. Australia 25: 199, 72 (1985).
Ixora oreogena S.T.Reynolds & P.I.Forst., Austrobaileya 7(2): 262 (-264; fig. 4, map 3) (2006).
Tarenna monticola S.T.Reynolds & P.I.Forst., Austrobaileya 7(1): 38 (-40, 54; fig. 2, map 2) (2005).
Triflorensia cameronii (C.T.White) S.T.Reynolds, Austrobaileya 7(1): 46 (2005).
(These may not all be accepted names.)

Selected publications

Book chapter contributions 
 "Sapindaceae", co-authored with J. G. West,

Articles

References 

20th-century Australian botanists
Living people
1932 births
21st-century Australian botanists